Cingulina spina is a species of sea snail, a marine gastropod mollusk in the family Pyramidellidae, the pyrams and their allies.

Description
The white shell has a length of approximately 9 mm. The numerous whorls of the teleoconch are flattened, with scarcely a distinct suture. They are encircled by three spiral ribs, four on the body whorl, the lower part of which is smooth.

Distribution
This species' distribution ranges from the northernmost existing specimens located within the Persian Gulf, Gulf of Oman and the Arabian Sea, to as far south as the South West Cape, Tasmania's southernmost point of land and off various coasts situated on the geographical exterior of the largest island in the world, Australia.

References

 Melvill, J.C. & Standen, R. (1901). The Mollusca of the Persian Gulf, Gulf of Oman and Arabian Sea, as evidenced mainly through the collections of Mr F.W. Townsend, 1893-1900; with descriptions of new species. Part 1. Cephalopoda, Gastropoda, Scaphopoda. Proceedings of the Zoological Society of London. 2 (1): 327-460, pls. 21-24
 May, W.L. (1923). An Illustrated Index of Tasmanian Shells. Hobart : Government Printer. 100 pp.
 Cotton, B.C. & Godfrey, F.K. (1932). South Australian Shells. Part 6. South Australian Naturalist. 14 (1): 16-44
 Saurin, E. (1961). Pyramidellidae du Golfe de Thailande. Annales de la Faculté des Sciences de Saigon. (1961): 231-266, pl. 1-5
 Iredale, T. & McMichael, D. F. (1962). A reference list of the marine Mollusca of New South Wales. The Australian Museum, Sydney, Memoir. 11 : 1-185

External links
 To World Register of Marine Species

Pyramidellidae
Gastropods described in 1864